Ellis or Ellice Hicks (c. 1315 – c. 1390) was an English knight.

Family 
Ellis' son was John Hicks of Tortworth. and his great grandson was Baptist Hicks, 1st Viscount Campden.
Ellis Hicks is a direct paternal ancestor of Robert (James>Baptist>Thomas>John>Ellis) Hicks who immigrated to Plymouth Colony, Massachusetts, USA, on "The Fortune" 9 December 1621, and as such is an ancestor to many of the American Hicks.

References

1315 births
1390 deaths
English knights